During the 1996–97 English football season, Wycombe Wanderers F.C. competed in the Football League Second Division.

Season summary
In the 1996–97 season, a poor start to the season for Wycombe saw Smith sacked after alienating himself from the Chairboys' fanbase in the process with what were perceived to be negative long-ball tactics. In September, with the club bottom of the league, John Gregory took over as Wycombe manager and turned their fortunes around and saved them from relegation.

Final league table

Results
Wycombe Wanderers' score comes first

Legend

Football League Second Division

FA Cup

League Cup

Football League Trophy

Squad

References

Wycombe Wanderers F.C. seasons
Wycombe Wanderers